Russell John Griffiths (born 13 April 1996) is an English footballer who last played as a goalkeeper for AFC Telford United.

Career

Everton
Griffiths began his career with Everton's academy and, after brief loan spells with non-league Northwich Victoria, Colwyn Bay and FC Halifax Town, before joining League Two side Cheltenham Town on loan for half a season. He made his professional debut on 6 August 2016 in a 1–1 draw with Leyton Orient.

Motherwell
On 27 January 2017, Griffiths signed for Scottish Premiership club Motherwell on loan for the remainder of the season. He made his debut on 6 May 2017, at home to Ross County.

On 9 June 2017, Everton announced Griffiths would leave the club, and he then signed a one-year contract with Motherwell on 21 June 2017. Griffiths was released by Motherwell at the end of the 2017/18 season.

AFC Fylde
On 28 June 2018, Griffiths joined National League side AFC Fylde on a one-year deal. He was released by Fylde at the end of the 2018/2019 season.

Chester
In July 2019, Griffiths signed for National League North club Chester on a one-year deal.

Griffths finished the 2019-20 season on loan at AFC Telford United before signing a permanent deal with the club in June 2020. He was released at the end of the 2021–22 season.

Honours
AFC Fylde
FA Trophy: 2018–19

References

External links

England profile at The Football Association

1996 births
Living people
English footballers
English Football League players
Cheltenham Town F.C. players
Everton F.C. players
Association football goalkeepers
Northwich Victoria F.C. players
Colwyn Bay F.C. players
FC Halifax Town players
Motherwell F.C. players
Scottish Professional Football League players
England youth international footballers
People educated at Christleton High School
AFC Fylde players
AFC Telford United players
Chester F.C. players